The following words used in English exist as loanwords from one or more Polynesian languages.

Words from Hawaiian and Māori are listed separately at List of English words of Hawaiian origin and List of English words of Māori origin respectively.

Kava An intoxicating drink made from plant roots. From Tongan.
Taboo  A social and/or spiritual prohibition. From Tongan "Tapu". Loanwords were acquired during Captain James Cook's voyages.
Tamure a dance. From Tahitian.
Tapa Bark cloth used for loincloths (Maro), turbans (Pare), kilts (Pāreu) and Cook Island Māori/Tahitian ponchos (Tīputa). From Tahitian and  Cook Island Māori. Commonly used to refer to Tongan, Samoan and Niuean bark cloth (Ngatu/Hiapo/Siapo) which differs from Tapa in that it is thicker, produced differently with different materials, colorfully dyed and highly decorated with patterns and pictures.
Tattoo a form of body modification using indelible inks. From Tahitian Tatau.
Tiki Carving in humanoid form. From various Eastern Polynesian languages.
Tu'i Tribal chieftain. From Tongan.

References

See also
Māori influence on New Zealand English

Polynesian
Polynesian culture